Table for Two was a Malaysian television show which aired in 2004 on TV3. 

The television series was created by Popiah Pictures and directed by Ng Ping Ho and produced by Anne Low.

The story was a spin off of a popular commercial which aired promoting facial wash by Ponds. The commercial was so popular that Ponds decided to make a series out of it. 

The series revolves around the relationship between the two main characters Adam and Sue.

Table for Two aired in English on Saturdays at 7pm and ran for one season.

Actors 
Azizan Nin
Melissa Maureen
Cheryl Samad
Alvin Wong
Soo Kui Jien
Wong Sze Zen
Azura Zainal
Douglas Lim
Bernie Chan
Shahrizan Ferouz
Osman Hamzah

References 

http://www.dzof.org/tablefortwo.html

2004 Malaysian television series debuts
2000s Malaysian television series
TV3 (Malaysia) original programming